Matthew Townshend (born 5 March 1982) is a Zimbabwean cricketer. He played nine first-class matches between 1999 and 2002.

See also
 CFX Academy cricket team

References

External links
 

1982 births
Living people
Zimbabwean cricketers
CFX Academy cricketers
Matabeleland cricketers
Cricketers from Mutare